The Devil's Arithmetic is a historical fiction time slip novel written by American author Jane Yolen and published in 1988. The book is about Hannah Stern, a Jewish girl who lives in New Rochelle, New York, and is sent back in time to experience the Holocaust. During a Passover Seder, Hannah is transported back in time to 1941 Poland, during World War II, where she is sent to a concentration camp and learns the importance of knowing about the past.

Background 
Author Jane Yolen, who is Jewish, noted that she had considered writing about the Holocaust for some time, but was overwhelmed. She was convinced to pursue the subject by an editor of hers at the time, who was a Rabbi's wife. The Devil's Arithmetic is the author's first book that deals explicitly with Jewish themes.

While writing the novel, Yolen spent a week at an Indianapolis private school; when she explained to students about her forthcoming work, one student asked if Yolen had made up the events of the novel, based on the real story of the Holocaust.

Plot
Hannah Stern is a Jewish preteen girl living in the present day. She is bored by her relative's stories about the past, is not looking forward to the Passover Seder, and is tired of her religion. When Hannah symbolically opens the door for the prophet Elijah, she is transported back in time to a shtetl on the Polish/German border in 1942, during World War II. Hannah is not immediately aware of the time period.

At that time and place, the people believe she is Chaya Abramowicz, who is recovering from cholera, the fever that killed Chaya's parents a few months ago. The strange remarks Hannah/Chaya makes about the future and her inability to recognize Chaya's aunt Gitl and uncle Shmuel are blamed on the fever.

At Uncle Shmuel's wedding, the Nazis come to transport the entire population of the village to a death camp near Donavin, and only Hannah knows all the terrors they will face: starvation, mistreatment, forced labor, and finally execution. 

Hannah and the other women are stripped, shaved, and tattooed with a number. Hannah and the other women are forced to dig trenches in the camp. Hannah struggles to survive at the camp, with the help of a girl named Rivka. Uncle Shmuel and some other men try to escape; the men are caught and then shot as everyone watches. Fayge, who was going to be married to Shmuel, is killed because she runs to Shmuel when he is about to be shot with the men that were caught. Yitzchak escapes and lives in the forest with the partisans, fighting the Germans.

Later, when Hannah, Rivka, Esther, and Shifre are working, a guard overhears them talking instead of working. Shifre tries to reassure the guard they have been working, but he takes them anyway and leaves Hannah by herself. As the three are about to leave, Hannah takes Rivka's place by putting on her babushka. Since the guards don't know their faces, this goes unnoticed by the officer. The girls are led to the gas chamber. She is then transported back to her family's Seder. Aunt Eva calls her over. Hannah looks at Aunt Eva's number; it is the same as Rivka's. Hannah (when she was Chaya) was really the girl she was named after, Rivka was Aunt Eva, and Rivka's brother, Wolfe, was Grandpa Will. (Aunt Eva said that they changed their names when they got to America.)

The epilogue at the end of the novel reveals that when the camp was liberated, the survivors were Gitl (weighing a mere seventy-three pounds), Yitzchak, Rivka, and Leye (a worker in the camp) and her baby. Gitl and Yitzchak immigrate to Israel where Yitzchak becomes a politician while Gitl organizes a rescue mission that is dedicated to salvaging the lives of young survivors and locating family members. The organization is named after Chaya, her niece that died a hero.

Themes 
Hannah experiences a time slip to experience the past. The novel employs time travel as a plot device and both a method for remembering and for the reader to more deeply feel the story. Yolen believed children would be more likely to engage with the past if the novel featured a contemporary child who went back in time and experienced history themselves.

Reception 
The Devil's Arithmetic received a starred review from Kirkus, which called it "a triumphantly moving book." Publishers Weekly called the book "brave and powerful."

In The New York Times, Cynthia Samuels noted that Yolen's use of the time travel convention was brought to "a new and ambitious level."

Adaptations 
The novel was adapted into a 1999 Showtime television film with the same title, starring Kirsten Dunst and Brittany Murphy.

Awards 
The Devil's Arithmetic was nominated for the Nebula award for best novella in 1988 and won the National Jewish Book Award (in the children's literature category) in 1989.

The script for the television movie was also nominated for a Nebula Award.

Further reading 

 Weil, E. (1993). "The Door to Lilith's Cave: Memory and Imagination in Jane Yolen's Holocaust Novels." Journal of the Fantastic in the Arts. 5(2), 90.

References

1988 American novels
American historical novels
Novels about the Holocaust
Novels set in New York City
Novels about time travel
Novels set in Poland
Novels by Jane Yolen
Culture of New Rochelle, New York
American novels adapted into films